Pedaran-e Olya (also Romanized as Pedarān-e ‘Olyā; also known as Kalāteh-ye Peydarān-e Bālā and Kalāteh-ye Pedarān-e Bālā) is a village in Mud Rural District, Mud District, Sarbisheh County, South Khorasan Province, Iran. At the 2006 census, its population was 59, in 15 families.

References 

Populated places in Sarbisheh County